The 1931 Indiana Hoosiers football team represented the Indiana Hoosiers in the 1931 college football season. The participated as members of the Big Ten Conference. The Hoosiers played their home games at Memorial Stadium in Bloomington, Indiana. The team was coached by Earl C. Hayes, in his first year as head coach of the Hoosiers, and they compiled an overall record of 2–5–1, with a mark of 1–4–1 in conference play.

Schedule

References

Indiana
Indiana Hoosiers football seasons
Indiana Hoosiers football